Rainbow is the twenty-eighth solo studio album by Dolly Parton. It was released on November 25, 1987, by Columbia Records. The original plan, when Parton signed with CBS, was for her to alternate between releasing pop and country albums (rather than trying to combine the two styles on each album), but due to Rainbow'''s poor sales and tepid critical reception, the plan was quickly abandoned, and Parton more or less focused on recording country material for the remainder of her association with the label.

The album was among Parton's lowest charting albums to that point.  It stalled at 153 on the U.S. pop albums charts and barely cracked the top twenty on the country albums charts; its first single, "The River Unbroken" missed the country top 40 entirely, stalling at # 63, and did not make the pop charts; its second single, "I Know You by Heart", a duet with Smokey Robinson, did not chart at all.  A third single, "Make Love Work", was released in June 1988, but fared poorly, likely due, in part, to competition from "Wildflowers", a top-ten single by Parton, Emmylou Harris and Linda Ronstadt released from their 1987 Trio album a month earlier.Rainbows release coincided with the launch of Parton's ill-fated 1987-88 variety show, Dolly'', and much of the music on the album was highlighted on the show.

Track listing

Personnel
Dolly Parton – vocals
Waddy Wachtel – acoustic and electric guitar
Kevin Dukes, Rick Vito – electric guitar, slide guitar
Dann Huff, Michael Landau – electric guitar
Al Perkins – steel guitar
Danny Kortchmar – 12-string acoustic guitar
Bob Glaub, Leland Sklar, Abraham Laboriel – bass
Steve Goldstein – keyboards, acoustic piano, synthesizer, bass synthesizer, drum programming
Bill Cuomo – synthesizer, synthesizer organ
Robert O'Hearn – synthesizer
Patricia Mabee – harpsichord 
John Vigran – drum programming
Craig Krampf – drum overdubs, drum programming
Jim Keltner – drums, percussion
Buck Trent – electric banjo
Bobby Bruce – violin
Tom Scott – saxophone
David Campbell – string arrangements, conductor
Hammer Smith – chromatic harmonica
Julia Waters, Maxine Waters, Richard Dennison, Carmen Twillie, Mike Chapman, Blaise Tosti, Anita Ball – backing vocals

Charts

Weekly charts

Year-end charts

References

External links
Rainbow at Dolly Parton On-Line

Columbia Records albums
Dolly Parton albums
1987 albums